William Kennedy was a Republic of Ireland international footballer who played as a midfielder.

St James Gate
Kennedy's first appearances as a League of Ireland player were with Crumlin outfit St Jame's Gate, with whom he played for ten years. Gate were the team of St James's Gate Brewery who brew Guinness stout, among other beers.

Shelbourne
In 1941, Kennedy moved across South Dublin to play for League rivals Shelbourne, scoring six goals in his debut season as Shels finished in a respectable 3rd place. He would stay for three years with the Reds, scoring 14 goals and helping them to a League and Shield double in the 1943–44 season. On 16 April 1944, he played as lost the FAI Cup Final, 3–2, against Shamrock Rovers in front of 34,000 spectators at Dalymount Park. This loss cost the club a valuable treble that season.

Brideville
In 1944, now in his 13th season as a League player, Kennedy moved to Liberties based club, Brideville. At the end of the 1942–43 season, Brideville had failed to get re-elected to the League. However they returned at the beginning of Kennedy's first season with the club, 1944–45, when they ironically replaced his old side St James's Gate who had dropped out of the League. Continuing his fine goal-scoring form, Kennedy notched five league goals that season, finishing as the club's top scorer. They finished second-last in the League but their return lasted just one season. They failed to gain re-election for the following season and were replaced by Waterford.

International
At international level, Kennedy was capped three times for the Irish Free State at senior level. He made his debut versus Holland on 8 May 1932 .

His second cap came at Dalymount Park on 24 February 25, 1934, in Ireland's historic first World Cup qualifying tie, against Belgium. Kennedy was Gate's sole representative in the team that day as 28,000 fans witnessed an entertaining 4–4 draw.

Honours

Club
St James Gate
 League of Ireland: 1939–40
 FAI Cup: 1937–38
 League of Ireland Shield: 1935–36, 1940–41
 Dublin City Cup: 1938–39
 Leinster Senior Cup: 1934–35, 1936–37, 1940–41

Shelbourne
 League of Ireland: 1943–44
 League of Ireland Shield: 1943-44
 Dublin City Cup: 1941-42

References

External links
 Profile from soccerscene.ie

Republic of Ireland association footballers
Republic of Ireland international footballers
Association football midfielders
St James's Gate F.C. players
Shelbourne F.C. players
League of Ireland players